Jagadal  is a village in the southern state of Karnataka, India. It is located in the Rabakavi-Banahatti taluk of Bagalkot district in Karnataka.

Demographics
 India census, Jagadal had a population of 5998 with 3044 males and 2954 females.

See also
 Bagalkot
 Districts of Karnataka

References

External links
 http://Bagalkot.nic.in/

Villages in Bagalkot district